Skin Tight may refer to:

Literature
 Skin Tight (novel), a 1989 novel by Carl Hiaasen
 Skintight, a 2008 nonfiction book by Meredith Jones

Music
 Skin Tight (album), by the Ohio Players, or the title song, 1974
 Skintight, an album by Liv Kristine, or the title song, 2010
 "Skin Tight", a song by Scissor Sisters from Night Work, 2010
 "Skintight", a song by Kid Confucius, 2005

Other uses
 Skin-tight garment
 Skin Tight (TV series), a 2016 spin-off from My 600-lb Life